Andrew Earl, or Andy Earl (born 1976), is a professional climber and coach from the north-east of England. He performs in both traditional climbing and bouldering having ascended both E9 and  graded problems in Europe. He was British bouldering champion from 2003 to 2006. In 2004, he won the silver medal in bouldering at the European Championships in Birmingham. In 2007, he won the fourth stage of the Bouldering World Cup, in Réunion.

Notable ascents
Bouldering:
 Monk Life, 8B+, Northumberland. (Second ascent)
 Blood Sport, 8A, Shaftoe Crags, Northumberland. (First ascent)
 The Bitch, 8A+, Northumberland. (First ascent)
 Desperado, 8A+, Northumberland. (First ascent)
 Cypher, 8B, UK.
 High Fidelity, 8B, UK.
 The Ace, 8B, UK.
 Careless Torque, 8A, UK.

Traditional climbing:
 The Dark Side, E9, Back Bowden Doors, Northumberland. (First ascent)
 The Prow, E9, Northumberland. (First ascent)
 The Young, E8, Northumberland. (First ascent)
 Endless Flight Direct, E8, Northumberland. (First ascent)

References

External links
 
 IFSC Profile

Living people
1976 births
British rock climbers
Alumni of the University of Sunderland